Sanqiao is a mixed Dong–Miao language spoken in Liping County and Jinping County, Guizhou, China by about 6,000 people.

The Sanqiao people sing traditional songs using the Suantang language, a Sinitic language that is similar to New Xiang.

Classification
Sanqiao vocabulary is about 30–40% Miao (Hmu) and 40%-50% Dong (Kam), with the remainder consisting of Chinese words. Sanqiao speakers can understand the local Dong and Miao dialects, but the Dong and Miao cannot understand the Sanqiao language.

Distribution
In Liping County and Jinping County, Guizhou, the Sanqiao live in just over 20 villages, with over 6,000 people (Yu 2017).

Sanqiao in a broader sense, however, is a grouping of about 30,000 people who speak unrelated languages, who are spread across Jingzhou, Huitong, Tongdao, and Suining counties of Hunan, and Liping, Jinping, and Tianzhu counties of Guizhou. In Hunan, they are also known as the Flowery Miao or Flowery-Clothed Miao, while in Guizhou they are known as the Sanqiao people.

The Sanqiao are distributed in the following locations of Qiandongnan Prefecture, Guizhou (Deng 2010). There are 22 villages in total.
Liping County
Pingdi Township 平底乡, Shangchong District 尚重区: Cendun 岑趸, Wushan 乌山, Bijie 俾嗟, Yanpi 眼批, Dongweng 董翁, Guidou 归斗, Guiya 归雅, Wule 乌勒, Pingdi 平底, Wupeng 乌碰, Tangtu 塘途, Gaoliang 高练, Biyazhai 俾雅寨
Dajia Township 大稼乡: Cennuzhai 岑努寨
Jinping County
Pinglüe 平略 and Qimeng 启蒙 townships: Zhaizao 寨早, Wendou 文斗, Shengli 胜利, Guben 固本, Xinming 新明, Dicha 地茶, Qimeng 启蒙, Yuhe 裕河

References

Yu Dazhong [余达忠]. 2017. "Ethnic Interactions and the Formation of the Sanqiu People in the Borderland of Modern Hunan, Guizhou and Guangxi Provinces [近代湘黔桂边区的族群互动和“三锹人”的形成]". In Journal of Guizhou Education University [贵州师范学院学报], Vol. 33, No. 1 (Jan 2017).

External links
“锹人”释考

Chinese-based pidgins and creoles
Languages of China
Mixed languages
Hmongic languages
Kam–Sui languages